Wang Ruei (born 10 August 1993) is a Taiwanese professional footballer who currently plays for Taiwan Football Premier League club Taichung Futuro.

Career
Wang Ruei made his international debut for Chinese Taipei in their 2018 FIFA World Cup qualification – AFC First Round first leg loss to Brunei. In the return leg, he would go on to score a goal which would help Chinese Taipei to win 2–0, and progress through to the next round 2–1 on aggregate.

On 27 December 2018, it was announced that Wang would join Hong Kong Premier League side Yuen Long. On 12 June 2019, assistant manager Fabio Lopes confirmed that Wang would be retained for the following season.

On 2 May 2020, Wang announced that his contract with Yuen Long had been terminated.

International goals
Scores and results list Chinese Taipei's goal tally first.

Personal life
Wang hails from the Mataan tribe of the Amis people. His cousin Wang Xianghui is the captain of the Chinese Taipei women's football team.

References

External links

1993 births
Living people
Taiwanese footballers
Chinese Taipei international footballers
Taiwanese expatriate footballers
Association football defenders
Association football central defenders
Footballers at the 2018 Asian Games
Asian Games competitors for Chinese Taipei
Expatriate footballers in Hong Kong
Taiwanese expatriates in Hong Kong
Hong Kong Premier League players
Yuen Long FC players
People from Hualien County
Amis people